Kevin Fiala (born 22 July 1996) is a Swiss professional ice hockey left winger for the Los Angeles Kings of the National Hockey League (NHL). He spent one season with the Malmö Redhawks junior team, then joined HV71, splitting a season between their junior team and their senior team in the Swedish Hockey League (SHL), being selected by the Nashville Predators 11th overall in the 2014 NHL Entry Draft. Fiala started the following season with HV71 before moving to North America halfway through, splitting two seasons between the Predators and their American Hockey League (AHL) affiliate, the Milwaukee Admirals.

Internationally Fiala has played for the Swiss national team at several tournaments, both at the junior and senior level, and has appeared in two World Championships.

Playing career
Fiala played in the 2009 Quebec International Pee-Wee Hockey Tournament with the Swiss Eastern team. He later played in various junior leagues in his native Switzerland prior to joining the Swedish club Malmö Redhawks for the 2012–13 season. His time was split between the U18 club in the J18 Elit and J18 Allsvenskan, and the U20 outfit in the J20 SuperElit. Fiala then joined HV71, with whom he debuted for during the 2013 European Trophy. Throughout the 2013–14 season, Fiala split time with the HV71 junior team in the J20 SuperElit and the senior team, who played in the Swedish Hockey League (SHL). He was praised by Head Coach Ulf Dahlén for his play following his SHL debut, a 5–4 defeat to Linköpings HC. Fiala was a finalist for the SHL's Rookie of the Year award; he finished tying for the lead among all SHL junior (under-18) players for points, with 11. Prior to joining the senior team in the SHL, Fiala had been one of the top scorers in the junior league, with 10 goals and 25 points in 27 games.

Fiala was ranked as one of the top European prospects for the 2014 NHL Entry Draft, being considered a top-three player by many scouting services; he ultimately was selected by the Nashville Predators 11th overall. The Predators signed him to a three-year, entry-level contract on 15 July 2014.

Fiala initially started the 2014–15 season with HV71. However, in January he was reassigned to the Milwaukee Admirals, the Predators American Hockey League (AHL) affiliate. At the time, Fiala had 14 points in 20 games, which was the sixth-most points of all junior players in the SHL. He made his NHL debut during the season, on March 24, against the Montreal Canadiens. He also appeared in one playoff game during the season.

He scored his first NHL goal on 14 January 2016, against Connor Hellebuyck of the Winnipeg Jets. Spending most of the season with Milwaukee, he finished the year with 50 points in 66 games.

In the 2016–17 season, Fiala made the Predators opening night roster. In his rookie NHL season, Fiala appeared in 54 games and scored 11 goals. He was assigned to the Admirals throughout the year and recorded with 19 points in 22 games. In the post-season, after a first round sweep of the Chicago Blackhawks, in which he collected two goals (including the overtime game winner in Game 3), Fiala suffered a broken left femur on 26 April 2017, playing in the opening game of the second round of the Stanley Cup playoffs. In the second period of the game against the St. Louis Blues, Fiala's left knee collided with the end boards after being checked by St. Louis Blues defenseman Robert Bortuzzo. Fiala was removed from the ice on a stretcher to a waiting ambulance and transported to Barnes-Jewish Hospital in St. Louis. Fiala fractured his left femur thus ending his 2017 playoff participation.

During the 2018–19 season, having tallied 10 goals and 32 points in 64 games with the Predators, Fiala was traded at the trade deadline to the Minnesota Wild in exchange for Mikael Granlund on 25 February 2019. On 11 September 2019, Fiala signed a two-year extension with the Wild.

On 16 August 2021, Fiala agreed to a one-year, $5.1 million contract with the Wild.

On 29 June 2022, Fiala as an impending restricted free agent was traded by the Wild to the Los Angeles Kings in exchange for defenseman Brock Faber and a first-round pick in 2022. After the trade, Fiala was immediately signed to a seven-year $55.125 million contract extension with the Kings.

On January 5, Fiala was named to the 2023 NHL All Star Game, his first selection in his career.

International play

Fiala played in the Ivan Hlinka Memorial Tournament in 2012 and 2013 as a member of the Swiss U18 national team. He also skated for his country at the 2014 World Junior Ice Hockey Championships, where he was lauded as one of the key players on the Swiss roster. In five WJC games, he recorded one goal and four assists, as Switzerland was eliminated by Canada in the quarter-finals. In May 2014, Fiala represented Switzerland at the 2014 IIHF World Championship in Belarus, registering two assists in seven games. Fiala was the third player in history to play in the under-18, World Junior, and World Championship in the same year (the first two were Andrei Kostitsyn and Vadim Karaga, both with Belarus in 2003). Fiala also participated at the 2018 IIHF World Championship, where the Swiss won silver. In the final against Sweden Fiala had a chance to clinch the gold in overtime but his shot went too low. After losing the shootout the Swiss had to settle for silver.

Personal life
Fiala is a native of St. Gallen, Switzerland, although both his parents are Czech. His father, Jan, played professional hockey in the Swiss lower leagues. After retiring Jan turned to coaching, and was one of Fiala's first coaches. Fiala is a polyglot and speaks five languages: Czech, English, French, German, and Swedish.

Career statistics

Regular season and playoffs

International

Awards and honours

References

External links
 
Kevin Fiala's SHL profile

1996 births
Living people
HV71 players
Los Angeles Kings players
Milwaukee Admirals players
Minnesota Wild players
Nashville Predators draft picks
Nashville Predators players
National Hockey League first-round draft picks
Sportspeople from St. Gallen (city)
Swiss ice hockey forwards
Swiss people of Czech descent
Swiss expatriate sportspeople in the United States
Swiss expatriate sportspeople in Sweden
Swiss expatriate ice hockey people
Expatriate ice hockey players in the United States
Expatriate ice hockey players in Sweden